Curitiba Zero Grau is a 2010 Brazilian drama film directed by Eloi Pires Ferreira and starring Jackson Antunes.

Plot 
In the cold city of Curitiba, four men spend their days in transit: one is a bus driver, the other is a catador (Paper Collector), the third works as an automobile merchant and the last one is a Motorcycle courier. The fate of these anonymous intersects in the heart of the city.

Cast 
Jackson Antunes
Katia Drummond
Rodrigo Ferrarini
Camila Hubner
Diego Kozievitch
Enéas Lour
Stephanie Mattanó
Olga Nenevê

References

External links
 

Brazilian drama films
Films shot in Curitiba
2010 drama films
2010 films
2010s Portuguese-language films